The Discriminatory Legislation regarding Public Amenities Repeal Act, 1990 (Act No. 100 of 1990) is an act of the Parliament of South Africa that repealed legislation permitting racial segregation in public facilities: principally the Reservation of Separate Amenities Act, 1953 and the Reservation of Separate Amenities Amendment Act, 1960, but also related sections of other acts as well as provincial ordinances.

Because the act only repeals other legislation, it is a spent law. Racial discrimination in public facilities is now prohibited by section nine of the Constitution and by the Promotion of Equality and Prevention of Unfair Discrimination Act, 2000.

External links
 Text of the act

South African legislation
1990 in South African law